Christopher Ray may refer to:

Chris Ray (born 1982), American baseball pitcher
 Chris Ray (ice hockey), American ice hockey forward
Christopher Ray, director of Almighty Thor and Mercenaries

See also
Christopher Wray (disambiguation)